You Carry Me is a 2015 internationally co-produced drama film directed by Ivona Juka. The film was selected as the Montenegrin entry for the Best Foreign Language Film at the 88th Academy Awards but it was not nominated.

Cast
 Lana Barić as Ives
 Vojislav Brajović as Ivan
 Nataša Janjić as Lidija
 Goran Hajduković as Vedran
 Helena Beljan as Dora
 Juraj Dabić as Jan
 Nataša Dorčić as Natasa

See also
 List of submissions to the 88th Academy Awards for Best Foreign Language Film
 List of Montenegrin submissions for the Academy Award for Best Foreign Language Film

References

External links
 
 Official website

2015 films
2015 drama films
2010s Croatian-language films
Croatian drama films
Serbian drama films
Slovenian drama films